John Barrett was an American professional left fielder for the  Brooklyn Atlantics of the National Association.  He played in eight games from September 18 to October 31, seven of which were in left field, and gathered seven hits in 34 at bats for a .206 batting average.

References

External links

Major League Baseball left fielders
Sportspeople from Brooklyn
Baseball players from New York City
Brooklyn Atlantics players
Year of birth unknown
Year of death unknown
19th-century baseball players